St. Swithin's Church, Lincoln is a Grade II* listed parish church located in St Swithin's Square, Lincoln, England. The congregation is still active as is the church but the building has been closed due to repairs being needed to the roof of the church.

History

The original church of St Swithin, was near the Sheep Market. It suffered a bad fire in 1644 during the English Civil War. It was rebuilt in stone in 1801. This was replaced with a new building on Sheep Square. The foundation stone was laid on Easter Day 1869 by the Bishop of Lincoln, Christopher Wordsworth.

The mathematician George Boole was christened in the earlier church on 3rd November 1815. He had a close association with the church whose Rector, Rev. Dickson, encouraged him in his mathematics.

The church was built to designs of the architect, James Fowler of Louth and financed by Alfred Shuttleworth, a Lincoln industrialist. The nave and aisles were built between 1869 and 1871, the chancel was completed in 1879, and the construction of the tower and spire took place between 1884 and 1887.

Nikolaus Pevsner described the church as "without doubt his (James Fowler's) most important church."

During the construction a Roman altar was discovered.

The church contains a west window which was made by A L Moore & Co.

The church was listed as Grade II* in 1973.

Present day
In October 2014, St Swithin's Church was relaunched, at the invitation of the Bishop of Lincoln, by a planting team from Holy Trinity Brompton (HTB) in the Diocese of London led by Revd Jim Prestwood.

The original church building is closed. The church now meets in person at the Salthouse in Free School Lane (the former Co-op Ballroom) at 9.15am, 10.15am and 6:15pm each Sunday. Although it is hoped that the church could be reopened for worship in the future, should funding be found and it being feasible.

Organ

Details of the organ can be found on the National Pipe Organ Register.

Organists
 John Pullein 1896–1903 
 A. A. Osborne 1903–1917
 Gerald Conran Hodgson 1917–1937 
 Michael Boltz 2010–2014

Bells
A single bell of 3 cwt and 21 pounds was supplied in 1851, cast by Messrs Mears. It is currently described as unringable.

References

External links
Genealogy wez site - summary page about Lincoln Churches

Lincoln
Lincoln
Lincoln
Churches in Lincoln, England
Lincoln
Holy Trinity Brompton plants
Rebuilt churches in the United Kingdom